Albert I, Lord of Mecklenburg (after 1230 – 15 or 17 May 1265) was briefly co-ruler of Mecklenburg from 1264 to 1265.

He was a son of John I and his wife, Luitgard of Henneberg (1210-1267), a daughter of Count  Poppo VII of Henneberg.  He ruled jointly with his brother Henry I.   He may have married a daughter of Nicholas I of Werle, but no record of such a marriage, or any children, has survived.

Albert I died in 1265 and was buried in the Doberan Minster.

See also 
 List of dukes and grand dukes of Mecklenburg

External links 
 Stammtafel des Hauses Mecklenburg

Lords of Mecklenburg
13th-century births
1265 deaths
Year of birth unknown
13th-century German nobility